Sergio Silvio Balanzino (Bologna, 20 June 1934 – Brussels, 25 February 2018) was an Italian diplomat.

He studied as a Brittingham Foreign Scholar at the University of Wisconsin in Madison 1956–1957. After graduating in Law from the University of Rome La Sapienza he joined the Italian foreign service in 1958.

He served as the Italian ambassador to Canada from May 1990 to January 1994. He then became the Deputy Secretary General of NATO before briefly becoming acting Secretary General twice. Firstly by replacing Manfred Wörner on 13 August 1994 after the latter resigned in the last stages of cancer. On 17 October 1994 he was replaced by Willy Claes, who resigned on 20 October 1995 following the discovery of his political corruption.

Balanzino, who had gone back to being Deputy, again took over the reins until he was replaced on 5 December 1995 by Javier Solana.

He taught in the springtime at the Loyola University Chicago Rome Center.

Honour 
  Order of Merit of the Italian Republic 1st Class / Knight Grand Cross – January 21, 1999

References

1934 births
2018 deaths
University of Wisconsin–Madison alumni
Italian diplomats
Secretaries General of NATO
Sapienza University of Rome alumni
Diplomats from Bologna
Ambassadors of Italy to Canada
Knights Grand Cross of the Order of Merit of the Italian Republic